The Lenkoran uezd or Talysh uezd was a county (uezd) within the Baku Governorate of the Russian Empire, and then of the Azerbaijan Democratic Republic and the Azerbaijan SSR until its formal abolishment in 1929. The county was located on the southern part of the governorate, bordering Caspian sea to the east, Javad uezd to the north, and Iran to the southwest. The administrative centre of the county was the city of Lenkoran (present-day Lankaran).

Administrative divisions 
The subcounties (uchastoks) of the Lenkoran uezd in 1912 were as follows:

History

The county was established on 10 April 1840 on the basis of Talysh Khanate. It was initially made a part of the Caspian oblast on 1840, and later renamed Lenkoran uezd in 1845 and made part of the Shamakhi Governorate in 1846. Due to an earthquake in Shamakhi in 1859, the centre of the Shamakhi Governorate was moved from Shamakhi to Baku and the governorate was renamed Baku Governorate.

In 1918, after the collapse of the Russian Empire, Azerbaijan Democratic Republic gained brief independence. Bolshevik Baku Commune was in control of Baku at the time, and they were trying to spread their control over other places in Azerbaijan, such as Lenkoran uezd. This led to the creation of the Mughan Soviet Republic in the territories of the Lenkoran uezd on 25 April 1919, but the republic was short-lived and it collapsed 3 months later, on 27 July 1919. Subsequently, the county was integrated into Azerbaijan Democratic Republic.

After the Red Army invasion of Azerbaijan in 1920, Azerbaijan was integrated into the Soviet Union and the county was abolished by Soviet authorities in 1929.

Demographics
According to the "Code of statistical data on the population of the Transcaucasian region" from 1886, the population of the county was 109,340 people, of which 50,887 (46.5%) Talysh, 50,510 (46.2%) were Azerbaijanis, 7,634 were Russians and 273 (0.2%) were Armenians.

Russian Empire Census 
The majority of the population indicated Tatar to be their mother tongue, with significant Talysh and Russian speaking minorities.

The significant share reduction of the Talysh population in comparison with the data of 1886 cannot be explained by natural demographic processes and is a consequence of the registration of Iranian-speaking Talysh as Azerbaijanis (“Caucasian Tatars”). After 1886, the Talysh did not move out and did not die out. It is clear that a significant part of the Talysh, on the basis of their language, are ranked among the Azerbaijanis (“Caucasian Tatars”).

Kavkazskiy kalendar 

Soviet census (1926) 
In 1926, the population of the county rose to 208,479.

Notes

References

Bibliography 

Geographic history of Azerbaijan
States and territories established in 1840
1840 establishments in the Russian Empire
1929 disestablishments in the Soviet Union
Uezds of Baku Governorate
Uezds of the Soviet Union
States and territories disestablished in 1929
History of Talysh